The Social Democratic Party of Kyrgyzstan (Russian: , Sotsial-demokraticheskaya partiya Kyrgyzstana; Kyrgyz: , Kyrgyzstan sotsial-demokratiyalyk Partiyasy) was a political party in Kyrgyzstan. Members formed the party on 1 October 1993, but did not register with the Justice Ministry until 16 December 1994. Abdygany Erkebaev served as the party's first chairman. Almazbek Atambayev replaced him on 30 July 1999. The majority of the party's membership is drawn from the country's entrepreneurs.

On 20 May 2004, the Social Democratic Party of Kyrgyzstan (SDPK) agreed to join the For Fair Elections electoral alliance. In October 2004, the larger El Party led by Melis Eshimkanov merged with the SDPK in preparation for the February 2005 parliamentary elections.

The party played a visible role in the Tulip Revolution and in large scale rallies in Bishkek in April and November 2006. A leading MP Temir Sariyev who joined SDPK in 2006 left the party due to his disagreement with Almazbek Atambayev becoming a prime minister in March 2007.

The SDPK received the votes of 8% of eligible voters in the 2010 parliamentary elections, giving it 26 of 120 seats in parliament. This result made the party the second of five parties to surpass the support threshold of 5% of eligible voters necessary to enter parliament. The party won a plurality 38 of 120 seats in the 2015 parliamentary elections. In 2017 its presidential candidate, Sooronbay Jeenbekov, won the presidential election with 54% of the vote.

In June 2018 the party was admitted into the Socialist International as a full member.

In March 2019, several party members aligned with former President Almazbek Atambayev split off from the SDPK and the government coalition over a widening rift with President Sooronbay Jeenbekov. Originally seen as Atambayev's hand-picked successor, Jeenbekov dismissed of most of the members associated with Atambayev's government when he was elected President and began investigations into possible corrupt practices by his predecessor. In May 2020, two of Atambayev's sons announced that they were joining a new political party, the Social Democrats of Kyrgyzstan. Several other members of the SDPK left following a 26 May session of the political council. In 2019 pro-Sooronbay Jeenbekov members reorganised Unity. Due to the several splinters, the SDPK did not contest the October 2020 parliamentary election.

The party de facto ceased its activities in the first half of 2020, when it split into the pro-Jeenbekov Birimdik and the pro-Atambayev SDK.

Notable members 
 Almazbek Atambayev (until March 2019)
 Roza Otunbayeva (until 21 May 2010)
 Sooronbay Jeenbekov
 Bakyt Beshimov
 
 Mirbek Asanakunov governor of Issyk-Kul Region from 2010 through 2011
 Asel Koduranova MP since 2015
 Asilbek Jeenbekov
 Kubanychbek Kadyrov
 Irina Karamushkina MP from 2010 to 2015

References

External links 
 SDPK website
 Kyrgyz Parliament website, SDPK page

Political parties established in 1993
Political parties disestablished in 2020
Political parties in Kyrgyzstan
Social democratic parties
1993 establishments in Kyrgyzstan